Ainslie Dixon Meares (1910–1986) was a prolific author, mainly on psychiatry, hypnotism, the treatment of cancer, and meditation. The following lists his different works in lexicographical order:

Journal articles

 Meares, A., "A Dynamic Technique For The Induction Of Hypnosis", Medical Journal of Australia, Vol.I, No.18, (30 April 1955), pp. 644–646.
 Meares, A., "A Form of Intensive Meditation Associated with the Regression of Cancer", The American Journal of Clinical Hypnosis, Vol.25, Nos.2/3, (October 1982/January 1983), pp. 114–121.
 Meares, A., "A Note On Hypnosis and the Mono-Symptomatic Psychoneurotic", British Journal of Medical Hypnotism, Vol.8, No.2, (Winter 1956/7), pp. 2–4.
 Meares, A., "A Note on the Motivation for Hypnosis", Journal of Clinical and Experimental Hypnosis, Vol.III, No.4, (October 1955), pp. 222–228.
 Meares, A., "A Working Hypothesis as to the Nature of Hypnosis", Archives of Neurology and Psychiatry, Vol.77, (May 1957), pp. 549–555.
 Meares, A., "An Atavistic Theory of Hypnosis", pp. 73–103 in Kline, M.V. (ed.), The Nature of Hypnosis: Contemporary Theoretical Approaches, Transactions of the 1961 International Congress on Hypnosis, The Postgraduate Center for Psychotherapy and The Institute for Research in Hypnosis, (New York), 1962.
 Meares, A., "Anxiety and Hypnosis", Medical Journal of Australia, Vol.1, (1966), No.10, (5 March 1966), pp. 395–397.
 Meares, A., "Anxiety Reactions In Hypnosis", British Medical Journal, Vol.I, (1955), (18 June 1955), p. 1454.
 Meares, A., "Atavistic Regression As A Factor In The Remission Of Cancer", Medical Journal of Australia, Vol.2 (1977), No.4, (23 July 1977), pp. 132–133.
 Meares, A., "Cancer, Psychosomatic Illness, and Hysteria", Lancet, Vol.II (1981), No.8254, (7 November 1981), pp. 1037–1038.
 Meares, A., "Defences Against Hypnosis", British Journal of Medical Hypnotism, (Spring 1954), pp. 1–6.
 Meares, A., "Group Relaxing Hypnosis", Medical Journal of Australia, Vol.2 (1971), No.13, (25 September 1971), pp. 675–676.
 Meares, A., "History-taking and Physical Examination in Relation to Subsequent Hypnosis", Journal of Clinical and Experimental Hypnosis, Vol.II, No.4, (October 1954), pp. 291–295.
 Meares, A., "Hypnography – A Technique In Hypnoanalysis", Journal of Mental Science, Vol.100, No.421, (October 1954), pp. 965–974.
 Meares, A., "Hypnotherapy Without the Phenomena of Hypnosis", International Journal of Clinical and Experimental Hypnosis, Vol.XVI, No.4, (October 1968), pp. 211–214.
 Meares, A., "Meditation: A Psychological Approach to Cancer Treatment", The Practitioner, Vol.222, No.1327, (January 1979), pp. 119–122.
 Meares, A., "Mind and cancer (Letter)", Lancet, Vol.I (1979), No.8123, (5 May 1979), p. 978.
 Meares, A., "Non-Specific Suggestion", British Journal of Medical Hypnotism, Vol.7, No.2, (1956).
 Meares, A., "Non-Verbal And Extra-Verbal Suggestion In The Induction Of Hypnosis. Part 1. Non-Verbal Suggestion", British Journal of Medical Hypnotism, (Summer 1954), pp. 1–4.
 Meares, A., "Non-Verbal And Extra-Verbal Suggestion In The Induction Of Hypnosis. Part 2. Extra-Verbal Suggestion", British Journal of Medical Hypnotism, (Autumn 1954), pp. 1–4.
 Meares, A., "On The Nature Of Suggestibility", British Journal of Medical Hypnotism, (Summer 1956), pp. 3–8.
 Meares, A., "Our attitude of mind in the psychological treatment of cancer", Australian Nurses Journal, Vol.9, No.7, (February 1980), pp. 29–30.
 Meares, A., "Psychological Control of Organically Determined Pain", Annals of the Australian College of Dental Surgeons, Vol.1, (December 1967), pp. 42–46.
 Meares, A., "Psychological mechanisms in the regression of cancer", Medical Journal of Australia, Vol.1 (1983), No.12, (11 June 1983), pp. 583–584.
 Meares, A., "Rapport With The Patient: Symbolic Significance Of The Doctor's Behaviour", Lancet, Vol.II, (1954), No.6838, (18 September 1954), pp. 592–594.
 Meares, A., "Recent Work In Hypnosis And Its Relation To General Psychiatry. Lecture I", Medical Journal of Australia, Vol.I, No.1, (7 January 1956), pp. 1–5.
 Meares, A., "Recent Work In Hypnosis And Its Relation To General Psychiatry. Lecture II", Medical Journal of Australia, Vol.I, No.2, (14 January 1956), pp. 37–40.
 Meares, A., "Regression Of Cancer After Intensive Meditation Followed By Death", Medical Journal of Australia, Vol.2 (1977), No.11, (10 September 1977), pp. 374–375.
 Meares, A., "Regression of Cancer After Intensive Meditation", The Medical Journal of Australia, Vol.2, 1976, (31 July 1976), p. 184.
 Meares, A., "Regression of Cancer of the Rectum After Intensive Meditation", The Medical Journal of Australia, Vol.2, 1979, (17 November 1979), pp. 539–540.
 Meares, A., "Regression of Osteogenic Sarcoma Metastases Associated With Intensive Meditation", The Medical Journal of Australia, Vol.2, 1978, (21 October 1978), p. 433.
 Meares, A., "Regression of Recurrence of Carcinoma of the Breast at Mastectomy Site Associated with Intensive Meditation", Australian Family Physician, Vol.10, No.3, (March 1981), pp. 218–219.
 Meares, A., "Stress, meditation and the regression of cancer", Practitioner, Vol.226, No.1371, (September 1982), pp. 1607–1609.
 Meares, A., "Teaching the Patient Control of Organically Determined Pain", Medical Journal of Australia, Vol.1 (1967), No.1, (7 January 1967), pp. 11–12.
 Meares, A., "The Clinical Estimation of Suggestibility", Journal of Clinical and Experimental Hypnosis, Vol.II, No.2, (April 1954), pp. 106–108.
 Meares, A., "The Hysteroid Aspects Of Hypnosis", American Journal of Psychiatry, Vol.112, No.11, (May 1956), pp. 916–918.
 Meares, A., "The psychological treatment of cancer: The patient's confusion of the time for living with the time for dying", Australian Family Physician, Vol.8, No.7, (July 1979), pp. 801–805.
 Meares, A., "The Quality of Meditation Effective in the Regression of Cancer", Journal of the American Society of Psychosomatic Dentistry and Medicine, Vol.25, No.4, (1978), pp. 129–132.
 Meares, A., "The relief of anxiety through relaxing meditation", Australian Family Physician, Vol.5, No.7, (August 1976), pp. 906–910.
 Meares, A., "Theories of Hypnosis", pp. 390–405 in Schneck, J.M. (ed.), Hypnosis in Modern Medicine (Third Edition), Charles C. Thomas, (Springfield), 1963.
 Meares, A., "Vivid Visualization and Dim Visual Awareness in the Regression of Cancer in Meditation", Journal of the American Society of Psychosomatic Dentistry and Medicine, Vol.25, No.3, (1978), pp. 85–88.
 Meares, A., "What can the Cancer Patient Expect from Intensive Meditation?", Australian Family Physician, Vol.9, No.5, (May 1980), pp. 322–325.

Selected books

 Meares, A., Hypnography: A Study in the Therapeutic Use of Hypnotic Painting, Charles C. Thomas, (Springfield), 1957.
 Meares, A., The Door of Serenity: a Study in the Therapeutic use of Symbolic Painting, Faber & Faber, (London),1958.
 Meares, A. Shapes of Sanity: A Study in the Therapeutic Use of Modelling in the Waking and Hypnotic State.  Springfield, IL:  Charles C. Thomas.  (1960)
 Meares, A., A System of Medical Hypnosis, Julian Press, (New York), 1960.
 Meares, A., Relief Without Drugs: The Self-Management of Tension, Anxiety and Pain, Fontana, (Sydney), 1970.
 Meares, A., Cancer: Another way?,  Hill of Content, (Melbourne), 1977.
 Meares, A., The Wealth Within: Self-Help Through a System of Relaxing Meditation, Hill of Content, (Melbourne), 1978.
 Meares, A., A Way of Doctoring, Hill of Content, (Melbourne), 1985.

Other works

The Medical Interview: A Study of Clinically Significant Interpersonal Reactions (1957)
The Introvert (1958)
The Management of the Anxious Patient (1963)
Relief Without Drugs: The Self-Management of Tension, Anxiety and Pain (1967)
Where Magic Lies (1968)
Strange Places and Simple Truths (1969)
Student Problems and a Guide to Study(1969)
The Way Up: The Practical Psychology of Success (1970)
How to be a Boss: A Practicing Psychiatrist on the Managing of Men (1971)
Dialogue with Youth (1973)
The New Woman (1974)
Why be Old?: How to Avoid the Psychological Reactions of Ageing (1975)
Let's Be Human (1976)
From the Quiet Place: Mental Ataraxis: Thoughts on Meditation (1976)
Marriage and Personality (1977)
The Hidden Powers of Leadership (1978)
My Soul and I (1982)
Life Without Stress: the Self Management of Stress (1987)
The Silver Years (1988)
A Better Life (1989)

Footnotes

Meares